Lilydale is a city in Dakota County, Minnesota, United States. The population was 623 at the 2010 census.

Geography

State Highway 13 serves as a main route in Lilydale.

Demographics

2010 census
As of the census of 2010, there were 623 people, 375 households, and 181 families living in the city. The racial makeup of the city was 95.5% White, 1.3% African American, 2.2% Asian, 0.3% from other races, and 0.6% from two or more races. Hispanic or Latino of any race were 0.8% of the population.

There were 375 households, of which 6.4% had children under the age of 18 living with them, 43.2% were married couples living together, 3.2% had a female householder with no husband present, 1.9% had a male householder with no wife present, and 51.7% were non-families. 46.1% of all households were made up of individuals, and 28% had someone living alone who was 65 years of age or older. The average household size was 1.66 and the average family size was 2.23.

The median age in the city was 63.3 years. 5.9% of residents were under the age of 18; 3.8% were between the ages of 18 and 24; 13.8% were from 25 to 44; 29.9% were from 45 to 64; and 46.7% were 65 years of age or older. The gender makeup of the city was 41.9% male and 58.1% female.

2000 census
As of the census of 2000, there were 552 people, 338 households, and 154 families living in the city. The racial makeup of the city was 94.93% White, 0.72% African American, 0.18% Native American, 1.81% Asian, 0.18% Pacific Islander, 1.63% from other races, and 0.54% from two or more races. Hispanic or Latino of any race were 2.17% of the population.

There were 338 households, out of which 5.9% had children under the age of 18 living with them, 41.1% were married couples living together, 3.3% had a female householder with no husband present, and 54.4% were non-families. 49.4% of all households were made up of individuals, and 29.9% had someone living alone who was 65 years of age or older.  The average household size was 1.63 and the average family size was 2.25.

In the city, the population was spread out, with 6.0% under the age of 18, 3.8% from 18 to 24, 14.5% from 25 to 44, 29.5% from 45 to 64, and 46.2% who were 65 years of age or older.  The median age was 62 years. For every 100 females, there were 70.4 males.  For every 100 females age 18 and over, there were 68.5 males.

The median income for a household in the city was $54,792, and the median income for a family was $82,001. Males had a median income of $52,500 versus $40,815 for females. The per capita income for the city was $42,724.  None of the families and 2.9% of the population were living below the poverty line, including no under eighteens and 0.8% of those over 64.

References

Cities in Minnesota
Cities in Dakota County, Minnesota
Minnesota populated places on the Mississippi River